The Remorseful Day is a crime novel by Colin Dexter, the last novel in the Inspector Morse series. The novel was adapted as the final episode in the Inspector Morse television series.

Title
The title derives from a line in the poem "XVI – (How clear, how lovely bright)", from More Poems, by A. E. Housman, a favourite poet of Dexter and Morse:

"Ensanguining the skies
How heavily it dies
Into the west away;
Past touch and sight and sound
Not further to be found,
How hopeless under ground
Falls the remorseful day."

Plot
Morse tries to solve the unsolved murder of Yvonne Harrison, as his health deteriorates.

Harrison, a nurse, has inspired romantic attachment in Morse during an earlier (and separate) illness, and he has written to her about it. She is a sharer of her favours; recipients, including her daughter's lover, are serially suspect.

His superintendent has found Morse's letter among crime-scene evidence but has sequestered it.

Morse dies of acute myocardial infarction; his last words are "Thank Lewis for me."

Publication history
 1999: London: Macmillan , Pub date 15 September 1999, Hardback

Adaptations
This novel was adapted for the television series Inspector Morse as an episode of the same title "The Remorseful Day", the final episode of the series (fifth in Series 8) as well as of the novels.

References

Further reading

 Bishop, David, The Complete Inspector Morse: From the Original Novels to the TV Series London: Reynolds & Hearn (2006)  

1999 British novels
Novels by Colin Dexter
British novels adapted into television shows
Macmillan Publishers books